The Forest Service Headquarters Historic District of Hot Springs, Arkansas, encompasses a collection of six historic government buildings on the south side of the junction of Winona and Indiana Streets.  These six vernacular stuccoed wood-frame structures were built by crews of the Civilian Conservation Corps in 1933 to serve as the headquarters of the Jessieville district of Ouachita National Forest.  They later served as the headquarters for the entire Ouachita National Forest.

The district was listed on the National Register of Historic Places in 1993.

See also
National Register of Historic Places listings in Garland County, Arkansas

References

Buildings and structures completed in 1933
Buildings and structures in Hot Springs, Arkansas
Historic districts on the National Register of Historic Places in Arkansas
National Register of Historic Places in Hot Springs, Arkansas